The 1908 Newport (Shropshire) by-election was held on 14 May 1908.  The by-election was held due to the death of the incumbent Conservative MP, William Kenyon-Slaney.  It was won by the Conservative candidate Beville Stanier.

References

1908 elections in the United Kingdom
1908 in England
By-elections to the Parliament of the United Kingdom in Shropshire constituencies
20th century in Shropshire